Jaffer Zaidi is a Pakistani musician, singer-songwriter, composer and pianist. He is best known as the lead vocalist of semiclassical band Kaavish. Propelled to success with the release of three singles "Bachpan", "Choti Khushiyaan", "Tere Pyar Mein" and album Gunkali, Zaidi has established himself as one of leading musicians in country.

Zaidi's album Gunkali received two nominations at 10th Lux Style Awards, including Best Artist for Zaidi and Best Producer for Faisal Rafi. It brought him a critical appraisal earning him a nomination at Best Debut award. Zaidi has also appeared in music reality series Coke Studio in three seasons, both as a musician and as a featured artist. With season 9, Zaidi made his debut as a music director and producer leading a team of singers under his supervision.

Personal life
He is the son of Shehryar Zaidi, a Pakistani television actor, and singer Nayyara Noor He married actress Yamina Peerzada in 2017.

Music career
Zaidi is best known as lead vocalist and pianist of a classical band Kaavish (meaning: Effort) along with Maaz Maudood who is a guitarist and backing vocalist, they achieved critical appraisal with their music videos and singles released under band's name. Their singles "Bachpan", "Choti Khushiyaan", "Tere Pyar Mein", "Apnay Watan Ki Mitti", "Moray Sayyaan" brought critical appraisal and earning him the Rising Star award at The Musik Awards 2006, and bagged nomination at 3rd Jazz IM Awards. In 2008 for The Musik Award he received two nominations including Best Ballad Song and Best Lyrics. He received two nominations at 10th Lux Style Awards.

Jaffer has been a member of the house band on Coke Studio since season 2. He, along with his band-member Maaz, appeared as a featured artist in season 4, and has been frequenting as a member of the house band in season 2, season 3, season 4, season 6, season 7 and season 8, however 2016 marked his debut as a music director and producer in season 9, where he served as one of six music producers on the show, producing and recording songs with assigned artist. His team includes Ali Azmat, Javed Bashir, Sanam Marvi, Ali Khan and Saieen Zahoor. He returned as a music director on Season 10. His band Kaavish also performed a track "Faasle" featuring Qurat-ul-Ain Balouch.

Discography

Television
 Behadd

Albums
 Gunkali

Singles
 "Bachpan"
 "Choti Khushiyaan"
 "Tere Pyar Mein"
 "Apnay Watan Ki Mitti"
 "Moray Sayyaan"

Coke Studio
 season 2: House Band
 season 3: House Band
 season 4: "Nindiya Re" and House Band
 season 6: House Band
 season 7: House Band, (Piano, Synth and String session)
 season 8: "Neun La Leya" and House Band
 season 9: Music Director
 season 10: Music Director and "Faasle"

References

External links
 
 Jaffer Zaidi at Coke Studio

Pakistani Shia Muslims
Punjabi people
Living people
Singers from Karachi
Pakistani male singers
Year of birth missing (living people)